Pandanus spathulatus is a species of plant in the family Pandanaceae, endemic to Mauritius but possibly extinct in the wild.

Description

This species is distinguished by its fruit-heads, each of which is packed with 2-3-locular drupes that are 6–7 cm x 4–5 cm in size. The exposed portions of the drupes are pyramid-shaped and have flat stigmas at their tips.

Habitat
It is endemic to Mauritius, where it was once widespread. Its habitat is now largely destroyed.

References

spathulatus
Endemic flora of Mauritius